The 2nd Battle Squadron was a naval squadron of the British Royal Navy consisting of battleships.  The 2nd Battle Squadron was initially part of the Royal Navy's Grand Fleet.  After World War I the Grand Fleet was reverted to its original name, the Atlantic Fleet. The squadron changed composition often as ships were damaged, retired or transferred.

History

First World War
As an element in the Grand Fleet, the Squadron participated in the Battle of Jutland.

August 1914
On 5 August 1914, the squadron was constituted as follows:
 HMS King George V
 HMS Ajax
 HMS Audacious
 HMS Centurion
 HMS Conqueror
 HMS Monarch
 HMS Orion
 HMS Thunderer

Battle of Jutland, June 1916
As an element in the Grand Fleet, the Squadron participated in the Battle of Jutland.  During the Battle of Jutland, the composition of the 2nd Battle Squadron was as follows:
 First Division
 HMS King George V Flagship of Vice Admiral Sir Martyn Jerram; Captain F. L. Field;
 HMS Ajax Captain G. H. Baird;
 HMS Centurion Captain M. Culme-Seymour;
 HMS Erin Captain the Honourable V. A. Stanley;
 Second Division
 HMS Orion Flagship of Rear Admiral A. C. Leveson; Captain O. Backhouse;
 HMS Monarch Captain G. H. Borrett;
 HMS Conqueror Captain H. H. D. Tothill;
 HMS Thunderer Captain J. A. Fergusson.

January 1918
By 1918, HMS Agincourt had been transferred from the 1st Battle Squadron.

Second World War

September 1939
By this time the squadron was in the Home Fleet and consisted of:
 HMS Royal Oak Flagship of Rear Admiral Henry Blagrove; Captain W.G. Benn;
 HMS Royal Sovereign Captain L. V. Morgan;
 HMS Ramillies Captain H. T. Baillie-Grohman;
  Captain G. J. A. Miles;
 HMS Rodney Captain E. N. Syfret.

Admirals commanding
Commanders were as follows:
 Vice-Admiral Sir John Jellicoe (May–December 1912)
 Vice-Admiral Sir George Warrender (1912–15)
 Vice-Admiral Sir Martyn Jerram (1915–16)
 Vice-Admiral Sir John de Robeck (1916–19)
 Vice-Admiral Sir Henry Oliver (March–April 1919)
 Vice-Admiral Sir Arthur Leveson (1919–20)
 Vice-Admiral Sir William Nicholson (1920–21)
 Rear-Admiral Reginald Drax (1929–30)
 Rear-Admiral Charles Little (1930–31)
 Rear-Admiral Wilfred French (1931–32)
 Rear-Admiral Ragnar Colvin (1932–33)
 Rear-Admiral Max Horton (1933–35)
 Rear-Admiral Charles Ramsey (1935–37)
 Vice-Admiral Lachlan MacKinnon (1937–39)
 Rear-Admiral Lancelot Holland (January–September 1939)
 Rear-Admiral Henry Blagrove (September–October 1939)
 Vice-Admiral Sir Alban Curteis (1941–42)
 Vice-Admiral Sir Bruce Fraser (1942–43)
 Vice-Admiral Sir Henry Moore (1943–44)

Rear-Admirals Second-in-Command
Post holders included:
 Rear-Admiral Herbert G. King-Hall, 29 March 1912  – 29 October 1912 
 Rear-Admiral The Hon. Rosslyn E. Wemyss, 29 October 1912  – 28 October 1913 
 Rear-Admiral Sir Robert K. Arbuthnot, Bart., 28 October 1913  – January 1915 
 Rear-Admiral Arthur C. Leveson, 17 January 1915  – 4 December 1916 
 Rear-Admiral Sir William E. Goodenough, 5 December 1916  – 31 March 1919 
 Rear-Admiral Sir Douglas R. L. Nicholson, 1 April 1919  – 7 April 1919 
 Rear-Admiral Lewis Clinton-Baker, 8 April 1919 
 Rear-Admiral Edward B. Kiddle, 1 April 1920  – 8 April 1921 
 Rear-Admiral Francis H. Mitchell, 5 May 1925  – 5 May 1926 
 Rear-Admiral Charles J. C. Little, 26 April 1930  – 25 April 1931 
 Rear-Admiral Lancelot E. Holland, 10 January 1939  – 25 August 1939
 Rear-Admiral Henry E. C. Blagrove, 25 August 1939  – 2 October 1939

References

Sources

External links
 Second Battle Squadron at DreadnoughtProject.org

Battle squadrons of the Royal Navy
Ship squadrons of the Royal Navy in World War I
Squadrons of the Royal Navy in World War II
Military units and formations established in 1912
Military units and formations disestablished in 1944